Granite Creek is a stream in the U.S. state of Nevada.

Granite Creek was so named on account of granite outcroppings near its course.

References

Rivers of Pershing County, Nevada
Rivers of Washoe County, Nevada
Rivers of Nevada